Mendefera, (Tigrinya: መንደፈራ) formerly Adi Ugri, is an ancient town which is now the capital city of the Southern Region or Zoba Debub of Eritrea. The town's name derives from the high hill in the center of the city and  it means that "who dared it" (in English) or "መን ደፈራ"( in Tigrinya) as it was a jungle and is a source of pride to Eritreans. The city is a reminder of the local anti-colonial movement.

History
Mendefera/Adi-ugri is an ancient town of the D'mt kingdom which was established as early as the fifth (5th) century BCE. It evolved into an important city in the Aksumite civilisation. Though satisfactory excavations have  not yet been made, a graveyard dating back to the 2nd century BCE has been found. It contained skeletons, pottery, necklace and bronze bracelets. Numerous buildings have been excavated since 1959, with both crosses and local and Roman coins found. Many areas, including tombs, have yet to be explored.

The town is now bustling market town in a fertile region of Eritrea. It is a place where small and large scale factories produce different products.

Mendefera is famous for its anticolonial movement during the Italian colonial administration and is a great fighter contributor of the Eritrean Libration Front (ELF) as it is home to one of the old schools in Eritrea, San Giorgio School.

Adi shiqano
Some villages in the vicinity of Mendefera include Adi-Bari(ዓዲ ባሪ), Zban ona(ዝባንዑና), Adi-ugri(ዓዲ ወግሪ), Berak(በራኽ), Adi-Gahad(ዓዲ ጋህድ), Dandere genet(ዳንዴረ ገነት), Adi-Zarna(ዓዲ ዛርና), Adi-Blay(ዓዲ ብላይ), Adi-Hare(ዓዲ ሓረ), Enda amanuel(አንዳ ኣማኑኤል), Mai Noh(ማይኖህ), Embezarb(እምበዛርብ), kudofelasi(ኩዶፈላሲ), Adi-Ada(ዓዲ ዓዳ), Deranto(ደርዓንቶ), Adi Bana(ዓዲ ባና), Adi Garma(ዓዲ ጋርማ), Adekemene(ዓደቀመነ), May Lbus(ማይልቡስ), Adi Groto(ዓዲ ጉረቶ), Kloawlia(ክለዉሊዕ), Ginebale(ጊነባለ), Adekeseyemti(ዓደቀሰየምቲ), Kefta(ከፍታ), Adewehaza(ዓደዉሓዛ), Egri mekel(እግሪመኸል) Adi-Mongotiy(ዓዲ ሞንጎቲ), Arato, Eritrea(አረቶ)..

Climate
Mendefera has a borderline climate that borders both on a cool semi-arid climate (BSk) and a subtropical highland climate (Cwb).

See also
Mendefera District

References

Mendefera

Aksumite cities
Southern Region (Eritrea)
Regional capitals in Eritrea
Populated places in Eritrea